Nucleolar GTP-binding protein 1 is a protein that in humans is encoded by the GTPBP4 gene.

GTPases function as molecular switches that can flip between two states: active, when GTP is bound, and inactive, when GDP is bound. 'Active' usually means that the molecule acts as a signal to trigger other events in the cell. When an extracellular ligand binds to a G protein-coupled receptor, the receptor changes its conformation and switches on the trimeric G proteins that associate with it by causing them to eject their GDP and replace it with GTP. The switch is turned off when the G protein hydrolyzes its own bound GTP, converting it back to GDP. But before that occurs, the active protein has an opportunity to diffuse away from the receptor and deliver its message for a prolonged period to its downstream target.

References

Further reading